William White may refer to:

Politics
William White (MP for Lymington) (died 1594), MP for Lymington
William White (MP for Clitheroe) (1606–1661), MP for Clitheroe in 1660
William White (Secretary of State) (1762–1811), North Carolina Secretary of State, 1798–1811
William White (Canadian politician) (1856–1953), elected member of the 1st Council of the Northwest Territories, 1883–1885
Sir William Arthur White (1824–1891), British diplomat
William J. White (politician) (1850–1923), United States Representative from Ohio
William Pūnohu White (1851–1925), Hawaiian politician
Sir William Thomas White (1866–1955), Canadian politician and Cabinet minister
William Henry White (politician) (1865–1930), Canadian Member of Parliament from Alberta
William White (New Zealand politician) (1849–1900), New Zealand Member of Parliament
William White (judge) (1822–1883), Republican politician in the U.S. State of Ohio and Ohio Supreme Court judge
William Duckett White (1807–1893), member of the Queensland Legislative Council
William P. White (mayor), mayor of Lawrence, Massachusetts

Religion
William White (bishop of Pennsylvania) (1748–1836), Episcopal bishop in America, Presiding Bishop and Chaplain of Congress
William C. White (1854–1937), son of Seventh-day Adventist Church founder Ellen G. White
William White (bishop of Newfoundland) (1865–1943), Anglican bishop in Canada
William White (bishop of Honan) (1873–1960), Anglican bishop in China
William White (bishop of the Southeast) (born 1947), Reformed Episcopal Church bishop in South Carolina
William A. White (1874–1936), American-Canadian Baptist minister, and only Black military chaplain in the British Empire during World War I
William J. White (journalist) (1831–1913), African-American civil rights leader, journalist (editor of the Georgia Baptist), educator, and minister in Augusta, Georgia
William White (priest), Anglican priest in Ireland in the late 18th and early 19th centuries
William White (missionary), missionary for the Wesleyan Church in New Zealand

Sports
William White (footballer) (born 1995), Bermudan footballer
William Edward White (1860–1937), American baseball first baseman, possibly the first African-American to play major league baseball
Will White (1854–1911), American baseball pitcher and manager 
William White (field hockey) (1920–1990), Scottish sportsman who played cricket and field hockey
William White (British Army officer) (1879–1951), English cricketer
William White (American football) (1966–2022), American football player
William White (Guyanese cricketer) (born 1953), Guyanese cricketer
William White (sport shooter) (1912–2011), British Olympic shooter
William C. White (American football) (1896–1986), American football coach
William Deacon White (1878–1939), American educator and sports promoter in Edmonton, Alberta

Music, media, and writers
William White (composer) (1571–c. 1634), English composer
William White (printer) (before 1577–1618), based in London, printed the first quarto of Shakespeare's Love's Labors Lost (1598) for publisher Cuthbert Burby
William White (publisher) (1799–1868), publisher of White's Directories in the 19th century
William White (journalist) (1807–1882), British pamphleteer and parliamentary sketch writer
William Allen White (1868–1944), American newspaper editor
William Lindsay White (1900–1973), American journalist
William Chapman White (1903–1955), American journalist
William S. White (1905–1994), American journalist and biographer
William White (academic) (1910–1995), American academic of journalism and bibliographer
William Anthony Parker White (1911–1968), better known by his pen name Anthony Boucher, American author, critic, and editor
William White (actor) (1921–1985), film producer and actor
William H. White (publisher) (c. 1925–1989), American author, editor and publisher
William H. White (maritime writer), American naval historical novelist

Military
William Allison White (1894–1974), English recipient of the Victoria Cross
Sir William Henry White (1845–1913), British warship designer
William J. White (general) (1925–2017), American general
William White (conscientious objector), Australian conscientious objector during the Vietnam War
William R. White (United States Army officer), U.S. Army general
William Sylvester White (1914-2004), American judge & member of the Golden Thirteen

Architecture
William White (architect) (1825–1900), English architect
William H. White (architect) (1838–1896), British architect

Science and medicine
William Alanson White (1870–1937), American neurologist and alienist
William Comings White (1890–1965), engineer, General Electric, Schenectady, NY
William E. White, American neurologist and author
J. William White (1850–1916), US surgeon
William L. White (born 1947), writer on addiction recovery and policy
William Toby White, Australian ichthyologist

Others
William White (economist) (born 1943), Canadian economist
William White (gangster) (1900–1934), Prohibition gangster and Chicago Outfit gunman
William White (Mayflower passenger) (c. 1580–1621)
William White (master), English academic, master of Balliol College, Oxford
William R. White (academic administrator) (1892–1977), president of Hardin-Simmons University, and of Baylor University
William Hale White (1831–1913), English writer and civil servant
Larry Grayson (1923–1995), English stand-up comedy and gameshow host, born William White

See also
Bill White (disambiguation)
Willie White (disambiguation)
William Whyte (disambiguation)